Batwas is a village in Kishtwar district of Jammu and Kashmir in India. It is located in Gandhari valley.

See also 
 Kishtwar district

References 

Villages in Kishtwar district